Ray Williams is a New Zealand rugby league footballer who represented New Zealand.

Playing career
Williams played for the Richmond club and first represented Auckland in 1968.

In 1970 he won the Lipscombe Cup as the Auckland Rugby League's sportsman of the year.

He was selected for the New Zealand side that year, coming off the bench in their 16-33 loss to Great Britain.

In 1971 he was part of the Auckland side that defeated Australia 15-14.

References

Living people
New Zealand rugby league players
New Zealand national rugby league team players
Auckland rugby league team players
Rugby league locks
Richmond Bulldogs players
Year of birth missing (living people)